The Birmingham Trophy was an invitational football tournament held at St Andrew's, Birmingham. The only edition took place between 8 and 9 August 1992. It was contested by four teams, one from Italy, one from Spain, and two from the host nation England.

Tournament

Bracket 

Birmingham City beat Real Mallorca 6–5 on penalties.

Real Mallorca beat Brescia 4–3 on penalties.

Results

References

English football friendly trophies
Defunct football cup competitions in England
International sports competitions in Birmingham, West Midlands
Football in the West Midlands (county)

1992–93 in English football
1992–93 in Italian football
1992–93 in Spanish football

1992 establishments in England
Birmingham City F.C.